Mechanicsville is a neighborhood of Atlanta, Georgia. It sits just south of downtown Atlanta.

The neighborhood is bounded by:
 I-20 on the north, across which is Castleberry Hill and Downtown Atlanta
 the  I-75/I-85 Downtown Connector on the east, across which are Summerhill and Peoplestown
 the Southern Railway lines on the southwest, across which is Pittsburgh

Mechanicsville is in NPU V.

History
Mechanicsville is one of the oldest neighborhoods in Atlanta. The neighborhood sprang up in the late 19th century, adjacent to several railroad lines just south of downtown. The name "Mechanicsville" comes from the "mechanics" that worked on the railway lines. It was once a vibrant multiethnic community with working class blacks and middle class whites, and home to several prominent merchant families, including the Rich family, of department store fame. Mechanicsville was established in 1870.  The mural in the background displays this information from an artists work.

Its decline was caused by urban renewal, migration to the suburbs, and the construction of Atlanta–Fulton County Stadium and the nearby interstate highways. The city of Atlanta has targeted the area for revitalization.

The movie ATL was filmed there. 
Big Gee of Boyz n da Hood was born and lives there.

Education
Atlanta Public Schools serves Mechanicsville.
Neighborhood Charter School serves Mechanicsville.

Atlanta-Fulton Public Library System operates the Mechanicsville Branch.

Neighborhood associations
The neighborhood organization is the Mechanicsville Civic Association and the Citizens Association of Mechanicsville. This CDC, SUMMECH, develops and implements strategies for revitalization of the neighborhood.

In popular culture
In the film ATL, the main characters, Rashad (played by rapper T.I.) and Ant (played by actor Evan Ross), both lived in Mechanicsville.

References

External links
SUMMECH CDC 
 Mechanicsville Report, Community Development Plan Update 2004

Neighborhoods in Atlanta